Women's Audio Mission is a non-profit organization and recording studio complex based in San Francisco and Oakland, California, whose mission is to promote "the advancement of women and gender-diverse people in music production and the recording arts."

History
Women's Audio Mission (WAM) was founded by Terri Winston in 2003 to combat chronic gender inequity in the music and sound industries (fewer than 5% of the people creating everyday sounds and media are women or gender-diverse)  and "change the face of sound." Winston, who got a bachelor's degree in Electrical Engineering from Purdue University, is a multi-instrumentalist who  toured with P.J. Harvey, The Pixies, and The Flaming Lips. Winston started with a career in recording and engineering. Her father was an engineer and she "grew up in research labs around engineers that were always pulling pranks" on her; as a result, she said, she developed the thick skin necessary for a woman to succeed "in male-dominated careers". In the early 2000s Winston was a tenured recording engineer professor and Director of the Sound Recording Arts program at City College of San Francisco, when she founded WAM. She has served as Executive Director since.

WAM runs the only professional recording studios in the world specifically built and run by all women and gender-diverse staff, world-class facilities located in downtown San Francisco, in the former SF Soundworks studio, and in Fruitvale, Oakland. They are home to projects by Beyonce's Band, Toro y Moi, Alanis Morissette, Denise Perrier, Radiohead, R.E.M., and Timbaland with much of the equipment donated by various manufacturers.

Accomplishments 

 Over the past 19 years, WAM has provide training and mentoring to 22,000+ women, girls, and gender-diverse individuals
 Provided programs across three cities (San Francisco, Oakland, and San Jose), five school districts, 50+ school partners
 Awarded a $1M grant from philanthropist MacKenzie Scott to seed $9M national expansion campaign
 Named "Best Hope for the Future of Music" by San Francisco Weekly
 Featured in Forbes, Billboard magazine, and on the cover of San Francisco Chronicle Datebook for success at bringing training programs online during COVID-19
 1,000+ women/gender-diverse students placed in creative tech/STEM jobs (Dolby Labs, Sony, Pixar, Disney, Pandora, Google, Facebook, ESPN, etc.)
 White House Office of Social Innovation studied WAM's revolutionary methods of using music/media to attract at-risk girls to STEM studies as part of President Obama's "Educate to Innovate" program
 Advisor to both the Recording Academy (GRAMMYs) & Academy of Country Music's Diversity, Equity, and Inclusion Task Forces.
 Produced/recorded award-winning projects/performances for 400+ artists including Sheila E., Beyonce's Band, Kronos Quartet, Neko Case, Angélique Kidjo (2014 GRAMMY), tUnE-yArDs, Toro Y Moi, etc., providing paid freelance work and critical professional credits for 450+ women/gender-diverse engineers.

Programs

Girls on the Mic 
A training and mentoring after-school program that provides 2,000+/year Bay Area girls and gender-diverse youth from under-resourced communities (96% low income, 93% BIPOC, ages 11–18) with free music/audio production, recording arts, and creative technology training in a professional studio environment.

WAM also organizes online classes; their Sound Channel program contains "animated, interactive e-textbooks that include audio examples, video demonstrations, DIY projects and quizzes" and was, according to Winston, used by 6,900 students in more than 131 countries.

WAM Core Training 
These adult education classes provide music/audio production and recording arts certification training to 1,000+ women/gender-diverse individuals a year and include courses such as: Live Sound 101, Podcasting, Introduction to Mastering, and Protools 101.

Internship Program 
This internal internship provides a paid position, professional skills training, mentoring, direct connections to corporate recruiters/mentors and job placement to 30-40 women/gender-diverse individuals a year. WAM has placed over 1,000 interns in paid positions in the industry through this program.

WAMCon 
These national music production/recording technology conferences have reached 1,500+ aspiring women and gender-diverse producers/engineers with award-winning female and gender-diverse audio professional mentors that have worked with everyone from Beyonce to Alicia Keys - in cities across the US (Los Angeles, New York, Nashville, Boston).

Artist Recording Residencies 
These studio residencies provide 5 -10 local BIPOC female and gender-diverse artists a year with free recording services and mentoring, all while providing work experience and professional credits to female and gender-diverse music producers and engineers.

Local Sirens: Women in Music Concert Series 
A free, quarterly performance series that promotes Bay Area women and gender-diverse artists and ensembles and has historically reached Bay Area audiences of 2,000+ per year.

References

External links

Terri Winston Interview with Sweetwater Sound on Editing Women's Audio Mission, The Sweetwater Minute, Vol. 297, in: SweetwaterSound, 3. July 2015

Women in music
Women's organizations based in the United States
Music organizations based in the United States
Arts organizations based in the San Francisco Bay Area
Music of the San Francisco Bay Area
Arts organizations established in 2003
2003 establishments in California
Women in California